In Greek mythology, Maron or Maro (Ancient Greek: Μάρων, gen. Μάρωνος) was the hero of sweet wine. He was an experienced man in the cultivation of the vine.

Family 
Maron was the son of Euanthes (some also call him a son of Oenopion, Silenus, and a pupil of Silenus), and grandson of Dionysus and Ariadne. As the son of Bacchus and the Cretan princess, Maron was brother to Thoas, Staphylos and Eunous.

Mythology 
Maron was mentioned among the companions of Dionysus. The city Maroneia in Thrace was named after its founder Maron; there he was venerated in a sanctuary. The god Osiris (Dionysus) left Maron, who was now old, in that land to supervise the culture of the plants which he introduced to the a city. "Maron who haunts the vines at Ismaros and, by planting and pruning them, makes them produce sweet wine, especially when farmers see Maron handsome and splendid, exhaling a breath sweet and smelling of wine."

Maron was also a priest of Apollo at Ismarus and the only one spared by the hero Odysseus when he pillaged the city. In Odyssey (9.200) before making Polyphemus drunk and fall asleep, Odysseus narrates:

Notes

References
 Athenaeus of Naucratis, The Deipnosophists or Banquet of the Learned. London. Henry G. Bohn, York Street, Covent Garden. 1854. Online version at the Perseus Digital Library.
Athenaeus of Naucratis, Deipnosophistae. Kaibel. In Aedibus B.G. Teubneri. Lipsiae. 1887. Greek text available at the Perseus Digital Library.
Diodorus Siculus, The Library of History translated by Charles Henry Oldfather. Twelve volumes. Loeb Classical Library. Cambridge, Massachusetts: Harvard University Press; London: William Heinemann, Ltd. 1989. Vol. 3. Books 4.59–8. Online version at Bill Thayer's Web Site
Diodorus Siculus, Bibliotheca Historica. Vol 1-2. Immanel Bekker. Ludwig Dindorf. Friedrich Vogel. in aedibus B. G. Teubneri. Leipzig. 1888-1890. Greek text available at the Perseus Digital Library.
Euripides, Cyclops with an English translation by David Kovacs. Cambridge. Harvard University Press. Online version at the Perseus Digital Library. Greek text available from the same website.
Eustathius. ad Hom. pp. 1615, 1623
Nonnus of Panopolis, Dionysiaca translated by William Henry Denham Rouse (1863-1950), from the Loeb Classical Library, Cambridge, MA, Harvard University Press, 1940.  Online version at the Topos Text Project.
Nonnus of Panopolis, Dionysiaca. 3 Vols. W.H.D. Rouse. Cambridge, MA., Harvard University Press; London, William Heinemann, Ltd. 1940-1942. Greek text available at the Perseus Digital Library.
Pausanias, Description of Greece with an English Translation by W.H.S. Jones, Litt.D., and H.A. Ormerod, M.A., in 4 Volumes. Cambridge, MA, Harvard University Press; London, William Heinemann Ltd. 1918. . Online version at the Perseus Digital Library
Pausanias, Graeciae Descriptio. 3 vols. Leipzig, Teubner. 1903.  Greek text available at the Perseus Digital Library.

Companions of Dionysus
Children of Dionysus
Deeds of Apollo
Greek mythology of Thrace